Soukaphone Vongchiengkham (Lao: ສຸກອາພອນ ວົງຈຽງຄໍາ; born 9 March 1992) is a Laotian professional footballer who plays as a winger for Trat in the Thai League 2.

International goals
Scores and results list Laos' goal tally first.

References

External links 
 
 Goal.com profile
 
 

1992 births
Living people
Association football midfielders
Laotian footballers
Laos international footballers
Laotian expatriate footballers
Laotian expatriate sportspeople in Thailand
Expatriate footballers in Thailand
Soukaphone Vongchiengkham
Soukaphone Vongchiengkham
Soukaphone Vongchiengkham
Soukaphone Vongchiengkham
Soukaphone Vongchiengkham
Soukaphone Vongchiengkham
Soukaphone Vongchiengkham
Footballers at the 2014 Asian Games
People from Champasak province
Asian Games competitors for Laos
Competitors at the 2019 Southeast Asian Games
Southeast Asian Games competitors for Laos